The following highways are numbered 639:

Canada

Ireland
R639 road (Ireland)

United States